Driss Chraïbi (July 15, 1926 – April 1, 2007) was a Moroccan author whose novels deal with colonialism, culture clashes, generational conflict and the treatment of women and are often perceived as semi-autobiographical.

Born in El Jadida and educated in Casablanca, Chraïbi went to Paris in 1945 to study chemistry before turning to literature and journalism.

Life 
Driss Chraïbi was born to a merchant family in French Morocco but was later raised in Casablanca. He attended the Koranic school before joining the M'hammed Guessous School in Rabat, followed by the Lycée Lyautey in Casablanca. In 1945 he went to university in Paris, where, in 1950, he earned a degree in chemical engineering. After obtaining his degree, he abandoned science before the doctorate. Instead, he earned his living from a string of odd jobs, before turning to literature and journalism. He produced programmes for France Culture, frequented poets, taught Maghrebian literature at Laval University in Quebec and devoted himself to writing. In 1955, he married Catherine Birckel, with whom he had five children. In 1978, he remarried with Sheena McCallion, a Scotswoman, with whom he also had five children.

He became known through his first two novels, Le passé simple (1954), whose depiction of a young man's revolt against traditional society generated controversy in Morocco during its struggle for independence, and its counterpoint Les boucs (1955) a ferocious attack on the treatment of North African immigrants in France.

A page turns with the death of his father in 1957. The writer, in exile in France, went beyond the revolt against his father and established a new dialogue with him beyond the grave in Succession ouverte ( 1962), translated as Heirs to the Past. Ten years later, La Civilisation, ma Mère!... (1972) gave a more lighthearted, fictionalised account of a Moroccan father's changing relationship with his wife and, more broadly, questioned the place of women in Moroccan society, offering renewed hope through the mother's evolution.

He died in Drôme, France., where he had lived since 1988, and was buried in the Shuhada Cemetery, Casablanca, Morocco, near his father's grave, thus fulfilling his last wishes. He took with him to the hereafter the secret of the last book he was working on.

Awards 
He was awarded the Prix de l’Afrique Méditerranéenne in 1973, the Franco-Arab Friendship Award in 1981. and the Mondello prize for the translation of Naissance à l'aube in Italy. Ref : https://www.lemonde.fr/disparitions/article/2007/04/04/driss-chraibi-ecrivain-marocain_891743_3382.html

Works 
His first novel, Le passé simple was published in 1954. Its English translation by Hugh Harter The Simple Past, was reissued in 2020 by NYRB Classics, with an introduction by Adam Shatz.

Other works by Driss Chraïbi:

The Butts (1955) - Les Boucs (1955; The Butts), translated by Hugh A. Harter, shifted the author's accusatory finger from a paternalistic Islamic formalism to the oppressed condition of many North Africans living in France.
From All Horizons (1958). Title in French : De tous les horizons.
The Donkey (1956) L'âne, and The Crowd (1961) La Foule; both confront the inadequacies of the newly independent Third World countries, as well as the failings of European civilization.
Heirs to the Past (1962) Original title: Succession ouverte. The English translation by Len Ortzen was published by Heinemann in 1972.
A Friend Is Coming to See You (1967). The weaknesses of Western values appear most noticeably in Un Ami viendra vous voir (1967; “”), in which Chraïbi combines the themes of insanity, violence, and the oppression of women.
Mother Comes of Age (1972). Original title in French : La Civilisation, ma Mère!.... Translated into English by Hugh Harter.
Mort au Canada (1975). "Death in Canada"
Flutes of Death (1981) Original title : Une enquête au pays. English translation by Robin Roosevelt
Mother Spring (1982) Original title La Mère du Printemps. English translation by Hugh Harter.
Birth at Dawn (1986) Original title Naissance à l'aube. English translation by Ann Woollcombe.
Inspector Ali (1991) Original title L'inspecteur Ali. English translation by Lara McGlashan.
Une place au soleil (1993) "A Place in the Sun"
L'Homme du Livre (1994). Translated into English under the title of Muhammad, a novel by Nadia Benabid, published by Lynne Rienner.
L'inspecteur Ali à Trinity College (1996). "Inspector Ali at Trinity College"
L'inspecteur Ali et la C.I.A (1997) "Inspector Ali and the CIA"
Vu, lu, entendu (1998). Memoir, 1st volume. "Seen, read, heard"
Le monde à côté (2001). Memoir, 2nd volume. "The world next door"
L'homme qui venait du passé (2004). "The Man who came from the past"

Chraïbi also wrote several children's books.

Death 
He died in southeastern Drôme, France on April 1, 2007, and was buried in Casablanca.

References

External links 

Driss Chraibi @ bibliomonde.com 
Moroccan-French novelist Driss Chraibi dies, April 2, 2007, CBC Arts
Audio Book (mp3): Incipit of 'Les Boucs' (Butts)  
Interview with Driss Chraïbi 
Driss Chraibi biography @ britannica.com

1926 births
People from El Jadida
2007 deaths
Moroccan children's writers
Moroccan writers in French
20th-century Moroccan writers
21st-century Moroccan writers
Academic staff of Université Laval
Moroccan novelists
20th-century novelists
21st-century novelists
Male novelists
20th-century male writers
21st-century male writers
Moroccan expatriates in France
Controversies in Morocco